Mitochondrial genome maintenance exonuclease 1, abbreviated as MGME1, is an enzyme that in humans is encoded by the MGME1 gene. MGME1 is a 344 amino acids long protein belonging to the PD-(D/E)XK family of nucleases. It localizes to mitochondria where it is important for maintenance of the mitochondrial genome. Loss of function mutations in MGME1 lead to defects in mitochondrial DNA, including mitochondrial DNA depletion, duplications, deletions and increased replication intermediates. Also, there is an accumulation of 7S DNA, a short single stranded linear DNA strand. MGME1 deficiency in humans leads to multisystemic mitochondrial disease.

Function 

The activity of MGME1 has been studied using the purified protein in cell-free in vitro assays. Together these studies suggest that MGME1 functions to remove single stranded nucleotide flaps that arise during mitochondrial DNA replication and/or DNA repair. MGME1 has a strong preference for cutting single stranded DNA, with weak activity on duplex DNA, and no activity on RNA. It acts as an endo-/exonuclease, requiring a free 5´or 3´ end for cleavage. MGME1 can cut 5´ flap substrates that mimic primer/repair intermediates. Moreover, MGME1 removes single stranded 5´-flaps in reconstituted mitochondrial DNA replication assays where it is required to enable ligation of the newly synthesized strand.

References 

Genes